The Extra (Spanish: El extra) is a 1962 Mexican comedy film directed by Miguel M. Delgado and starring Cantinflas and Alma Delia Fuentes. In the film, Cantinflas plays a man who works as an extra through several films. This was the last Cantinflas film whose art direction was made by long-time set designer Gunther Gerzso.

Plot
Rogaciano (Cantinflas) is the modest worker of a Mexican film studio, who performs several  roles as an extra in the films shot there. His excessive zeal at work causes the antipathy of successive directors who do not support his forays into their films. After his run-ins into film sets, he dreams that he is the protagonist of each of the productions of which he has participated, such as him playing a sans-culotte and saving Marie Antoinette in a film about the French Revolution, being the lover of Marguerite Gautier in a retelling of La Dame aux Camélias in which she survives, and saving a maiden from an Aztec sacrifice by fighting a warrior (defeating him by fighting him as if it were a bullfight) in an Aztec film.

In one of the productions Rogaciano is in, he meets Rosita (Alma Delia Fuentes), a young woman who also works as an extra, who is initially disappointed in the treatment of the studio workers, who tell her that they don't need more people like her to work there. Rogaciano, seeing the situation of Rosita, who is the guardian of her two younger brothers and has economic deficiencies, helps her to be chosen as an actress in an audition for a blockbuster conducted by the directors of the studio where Rogaciano and Rosita work. After signing Rosita to a contract, the directors, having been made aware of Rosita's relation to Rogaciano, tell her that from now on she must not get involved with him due to Rogaciano's low social status. Rosita is reluctant to this, but Rogaciano learns this and, albeit heartbroken, convinces her to follow through it.

Cast
Cantinflas as Rogaciano
Alma Delia Fuentes as Rosa Hernández "Rosita"
Carmen Molina as Actress who plays Marguerite Gautier
Guillermina Téllez Girón as Actress with torta
Magda Donato as Actress who plays Olympia
Alejandro Ciangherotti as Director of Aztec scene
León Barroso as Film director
Luis Manuel Pelayo as Director of cowboy scene
Eric del Castillo as Actor who plays Armand Duval (as J.E. Eric del Castillo)
Guillermo Rivas as Actor who plays villain on French Revolution scene
Antonio Raxel as Director of La Dame aux Camélias scene
Armando Arriola as Doctor
Gerardo del Castillo as Mr. Menéndez (as Gerardo del Castillo Jr.)
Edmundo Espino as Don Julián
Valentin Trujillo as Chevo, Rosa's brother (as Valentin Trujillo Gazcon)
Adrián Gallardo
Chabelo as Panchito (as Javier Lopez Rodriguez "Chabelo")
Antonio Bravo as Aztec film producer
Manuel Alvarado as Fat seamster
Alberto Catalá as Assistant Director
Enrique Lucero as Actor who plays Aztec priest
Raúl Meraz as Actor who plays French Revolution soldier
Roy Fletcher as Assistant Director of La Dame aux Camélias scene
Yolanda Ciani as Lilia, actress in cowboy scene
José Carlos Méndez as Cuco, Rosa's brother
Katherine George	
Erika Carlsson as Actress who plays Marie Antoinette (Toñita) (as Erika Carlson)
Arya Morales
Jorge Casanova as Assistant Director of Aztec scene
Armando Gutiérrez as Don Matías
Gabriel Álvarez
Arturo Cobo as "Frank Sinatra"
Irma Serrano as Lady at audition
Armando Acosta as Studio employee (uncredited)
Marco Antonio Arzate as Actor in cowboy scene (uncredited)
Felipe de Flores as Actor who plays Captain (uncredited)
José Luis Fernández as Actor in cowboy scene (uncredited)
Nathanael León as Villain in cowboy scene (uncredited)
Rubén Márquez as Martínez, studio employee (uncredited)
Fernando Yapur as Douglas (uncredited)

Analysis
Professor Jeffrey M. Pilcher, on Cantinflas and the Chaos of Mexican Modernity, argued that in the film, Cantinflas "continued to perpetuate" a theme from his previous films of "helping beautiful young women live fairy tales," and that during his character's dream sequence about the French Revolution, Cantinflas "preached a conservative view of national history" by "inserting referentes to Pancho Villa and the Mexican Revolution within a monarchist speech in defense of Marie Antoinette and respect for a traditional, hierarchical society."

In popular culture
The film is referenced in the Colombian novel Érase una vez en Colombia (Comedia romántica y El espantapájaros) by Ricardo Silva Romero.

References

Bibliography
García Riera, Emilio. Historia documental del cine mexicano: 1961. Ediciones Era, 1969.
Pilcher, Jeffrey M. Cantinflas and the Chaos of Mexican Modernity. Rowman & Littlefield, 2001.
Silva Romero, Ricardo. Érase una vez en Colombia (Comedia romántica y El espantapájaros). Penguin Random House Grupo Editorial Colombia, 2013.

External links

1962 comedy films
1962 films
Mexican comedy films
Films directed by Miguel M. Delgado
Films about films
1960s Mexican films